Jimmy Thomson (10 April 1937 – 4 August 2012) was a Scottish football player and manager. He played for St Mirren, Dunfermline Athletic and Raith Rovers, and then managed Scottish Football League clubs Berwick Rangers and Raith Rovers. Thomson was one of four Raith managers in the space of fourteen months following Jimmy Nicholl's move to Millwall in 1996. Thomson also served Raith's Fife rivals Dunfermline Athletic as caretaker manager in two different spells.

References 

Scottish footballers
Association football wing halves
Scottish Football League players
St Mirren F.C. players
Dunfermline Athletic F.C. players
Raith Rovers F.C. players
Scottish football managers
Berwick Rangers F.C. managers
Dunfermline Athletic F.C. managers
Raith Rovers F.C. managers
1937 births
2012 deaths
Scottish Football League managers